Harry Foxall (9 November 1901–1976) was an English footballer who played in the Football League for Merthyr Town and Portsmouth.

References

1901 births
1976 deaths
English footballers
Association football midfielders
English Football League players
Cradley Heath F.C. players
Pontypridd F.C. players
Merthyr Town F.C. players
Portsmouth F.C. players
Stourbridge F.C. players